Let's Dance is a 2009 Bollywood film that stars Gayatri Patel, Ajay Chaudhary and Aquib Afzal in the lead roles. It is directed and edited by Aarif Sheikh.

Plot
Suhani, a passionate young dancer, dreams of being a star her entire life. Fourteen-year-old Aftab, a gifted dancer, has never dreamed, ever. She can see nothing beyond starring in an R.J. Music Video. He can see nothing beyond making a life on the streets. When she sees Aftab's gang dancing on a street corner one night, she has no idea that her dreams are about to change. She's moved by the talent these street kids possess and wants the world to give them their due. But Aftab has no faith in her dreams for them. Will she be able to restore his faith in her? Will she get them the life they deserve, but cannot even dream of?

Cast
 Gayatri Patel as Suhani
 Ajay Chaudhary as Neil Choudhary
 Paras Arora as Kallu
 Aquib Afzal as Rehaan Jones A.K.A. R.J.
 Aabhaas as Aftab Siddique
 Nikunj Pandey as Ali Kamran
 Sugandha Garg as Anoushka Deshmukh
 Anjan Shrivastav as Sharma Ji

Music
Music of the film is by Vipin Mishra and Tarali Sharma. Music of the movie got released on 10 June 2009, at J.W. Marriott hotel, Mumbai. Malaika Arora Khan and Himesh Reshammiya were also present at the launch.

References

External links 
 
   Bharatstudents Article

2009 films
2000s Hindi-language films